Vedresevo is a rural locality (a village) in Nikolsky Selsoviet, Krasnokamsky District, Bashkortostan, Russia. The population was 97 as of 2010. There are 2 streets.

Geography 
Vedresevo is located 34 km east of Nikolo-Beryozovka (the district's administrative centre) by road. Kichikir is the nearest rural locality.

References 

Rural localities in Krasnokamsky District